Voda is an unincorporated community in Trego County, Kansas, United States.  It is located approximately 7 miles west of WaKeeney.

History
A post office in Voda opened in 1904, closed in 1907, reopened in 1912, and closed permanently in 1913.

References

Further reading

External links
 Trego County maps: Current, Historic, KDOT

Unincorporated communities in Trego County, Kansas
Unincorporated communities in Kansas